Dendronotus robilliardi is a species of sea slugs, a dendronotid nudibranch, a shell-less marine gastropod mollusc in the family Dendronotidae.

Taxonomic history
This species was correctly recognised as separate from Dendronotus albus by Robilliard in 1960. However he identified it as D. albus and described the true D. albus as Dendronotus diversicolor.

Distribution 
This marine animal can be found in the NE Pacific Ocean from Alaska to California and in the NW Pacific from Russia and Korea.

Description
This species grows to a maximum length of 40 mm. It is distinguished from Dendronotus albus by having more than four pairs of cerata, (typically 5 to 7), whilst D . albus is a bigger animal but has no more than four or five pairs. The body and cerata are translucent white with opaque white and orange-yellow tips to the cerata, although in some cases the orange-yellow is absent.

Diet
This species feeds preferentially on the hydroid Thuiaria argentea in the family Sertulariidae. Dendronotus albus is said to prefer Abietinaria greenei, Hydrallmania distans and Abietinaria amphora.

References

Dendronotidae
Gastropods described in 2016